Edda Giselle Rosetta Nuñez Clarette (born September 24, 1979), better known by her screen name Julia Clarete, is a Filipina singer, actress, television host, and performer. She is best known as one of the co-hosts of Eat Bulaga!, the longest actively running noontime TV show in the Philippines.

Clarete was introduced as a member of Star Circle (now Star Magic) Batch 4 in 1996.

Personal life

Julia is the youngest child with two older brothers; all of them studied at Casa Del Nino Montessori and attended high school in San Pedro Laguna. 
 
In May 2007, she gave birth to a son named Sebastian, fathered by Stephen Uy. She is married to Gareth McGeown, Coca-Cola’s Commercial Director for Malaysia and Singapore. 

In January 2016, Clarete, now based in Kuala Lumpur, resigned as one of the hosts of Eat Bulaga! after 10 years, due to personal reasons. In March 2016, she made an appearance in Eat Bulaga! and even joked about applying for a position as a cast member.

Filmography

Film

Television

Concert

Discography
 Bumalik Ka Lang (2006)

Magazine appearances
 FHM Philippines December 2005 issue
 Smart Alternatives Magazine April/May 2011 issue

Awards and nominations

External links
 Julia Clarete on FHM.com.ph

References

1979 births
Living people
20th-century Filipino actresses
21st-century Filipino actresses
Filipino child actresses
Filipino film actresses
Filipino television actresses
Filipino television personalities
Singers from Makati
Actresses from Metro Manila
Filipino women comedians
21st-century Filipino women singers

ABS-CBN personalities
Star Magic
GMA Network personalities
TV5 (Philippine TV network) personalities